Ellis Jones may refer to:
 Ellis Jones (sociologist) (born 1970), American sociologist and author
 Ellis Jones (American football) (1921–2002), American football player
 Ellis Jones (footballer, born 2003), English footballer
 Ellis Jones (footballer, born 1900) (1900–1972), English footballer
 Ellis O. Jones, American magazine editor of Life and Good Morning